Stephan Angeloff (1878–1964) was a Bulgarian microbiologist. He was a member of the Bulgarian Academy of Sciences and the Academy of Sciences Leopoldina, and served as rector of Sofia University from 1941 to 1942.

References 
Short Biography

Bulgarian microbiologists
1878 births
1964 deaths
People from Kotel, Bulgaria
Rectors of Sofia University